The women's snowboard cross competition of the 2015 Winter Universiade was held at Sulayr Snowpark, Sierra Nevada, Spain at February 6, 2015.

The qualification round and elimination round was completed on February 6.

Results

Qualification

Elimination round

Quarterfinals

Quarterfinal 1

Quarterfinal 2

Quarterfinal 3

Quarterfinal 4

Semifinals

Semifinal 1

Semifinal 2

Finals
Small Final

Big Final

Women's cross